In computer file systems, a block allocation map is a data structure used to track disk blocks that are considered "in use".  Blocks may also be referred to as allocation units or clusters.

CP/M used a block allocation map in its directory.  Each directory entry could list 8 or 16 blocks (depending on disk format) that were allocated to a file.  If a file used more blocks, additional directory entries would be needed.  Thus, a single file could have multiple directory entries.  A benefit of this method is the possibility to use sparse files by declaring a large file size but only allocating blocks that are actually used.  A detriment of this method is the disk may have free space (unallocated blocks) but data cannot be appended to a file because all directory entries are used.

Errata
The Commodore DOS used a similarly named but significantly different noting.

See also
File Allocation Table
Design of the FAT file system

References

Computer file systems